Bishop Andrew J. Roborecki (12 December 1910 in Velyki Mosty, Austro-Hungarian Empire (present day in Chervonohrad Raion, Lviv Oblast, Ukraine) – 24 October 1982 in Toronto, Ontario, Canada) was a Ukrainian-born Canadian Ukrainian Greek Catholic hierarch. He served as the Titular Bishop of Tanais and Auxiliary Bishop of Apostolic Exarchate of Central Canada from 14 February 1948 until 10 March 1951 and as the first Eparchial Bishop of Ukrainian Catholic Eparchy of Saskatoon from 10 March 1951 until his death on 24 October 1982 (until 3 November 1956 with title of Apostolic Exarch of Saskatoon).

Life
Bishop Roborecki was born in the family of Yakiv and Anastasiya Roboretskyi in Halychyna, but in 1913 with family moved to Canada, where he grew up.

After that he had a various pastoral assignments and served as parish priest in the parishes of Apostolic Exarchate of Canada.

On February 14, 1948, Fr. Roborecki was nominated by Pope Pius XII and on May 27, 1948 consecrated to the Episcopate as the Titular Bishop of Tanais and Auxiliary Bishop of Apostolic Exarchate of Central Canada. The principal consecrator was Archbishop Basil Ladyka.

Bishop Roborecki died on October 24, 1982 in the age 71, while participated in a one conference in Toronto.

References

1910 births
1982 deaths
People from Lviv Oblast
People from the Kingdom of Galicia and Lodomeria
Ukrainian Austro-Hungarians
Austro-Hungarian emigrants to Canada
Ukrainian emigrants to Canada
Naturalized citizens of Canada
Canadian bishops
Canadian Eastern Catholics
20th-century Eastern Catholic bishops
Bishops of the Ukrainian Greek Catholic Church
Canadian members of the Ukrainian Greek Catholic Church
Participants in the Second Vatican Council
Eastern Catholic bishops in Canada